The Château de Lavison is a château in Loubens, Gironde, Nouvelle-Aquitaine, France.

Châteaux in Gironde
Monuments historiques of Gironde